1974 in sports describes the year's events in world sport.

Alpine skiing
 Alpine Skiing World Cup
 Men's overall season champion: Piero Gros, Italy
 Women's overall season champion: Annemarie Pröll, Austria

American football
 13 January – Super Bowl VIII: the Miami Dolphins (AFC) won 24–7 over the Minnesota Vikings (NFC)
 Location: Rice Stadium
 Attendance: 71,882
 MVP: Larry Csonka, FB (Miami)
 World Bowl I – Birmingham Americans won 22–21 over Florida Blazers (at Birmingham, Alabama)
 Sugar Bowl (1973 season):
 The game was actually played on 31 December 1973; other major bowl games were played on 1 January 1974
 The Notre Dame Fighting Irish won 24–23 over the Alabama Crimson Tide to win AP Poll national championship
 1974 NCAA Division I football season:
 The Oklahoma Sooners win the AP Poll national championship; do not play in any bowl the following January due to sanctions

Artistic gymnastics
 World Artistic Gymnastics Championships –
 Men's all-around champion: Shigeru Kasamatsu, Japan
 Women's all-around champion: Ludmilla Tourischeva, USSR
 Men's team competition champion: Japan
 Women's team competition champion: USSR

Association football
 Brazil – CR Vasco da Gama wins the Campeonato Brasileiro
 FIFA gives to Colombia the right to host the 1986 FIFA World Cup, but Colombian officials decided in late 1982 that they could not afford to host the tournament on the scale FIFA required.
 Football World Cup – West Germany won 2–1 over the Netherlands.
 England – FA Cup – Liverpool won 3–0 over Newcastle United.
 Ecuador – Ecuadorian Serie A Champions: Liga Deportiva Universitaria de Quito

Athletics
 January – 1974 Commonwealth Games held at Christchurch, New Zealand
 September – East German athlete Manfred Kuschmann wins the 1974 European Championships in Rome

Australian rules football
 Victorian Football League
 Richmond wins the 78th VFL Premiership (Richmond 18.20 (128) d North Melbourne 13.9 (87))
 Brownlow Medal awarded to Keith Greig (North Melbourne)

Baseball
 16 January – Former Yankees teammates Mickey Mantle and Whitey Ford are inducted into the Baseball Hall of Fame. Mantle becomes only the seventh player to make it in his first try. His 536 home runs with the Yankees ranked second only to Babe Ruth and he played in more games (2,401) than any other pinstriper, including Lou Gehrig. Ford was arguably the greatest Yankees pitcher of all time, retiring with more wins (236), more innings (3,171), more strikeouts (1,956), and more shutouts (45) than anyone in club history.
 Frank Robinson becomes the first African-American manager in Major League Baseball.
 8 April – Hank Aaron hit home run# 715 in the fourth inning off Los Angeles Dodgers pitcher Al Downing breaking Babe Ruth's career home run record.
 4 June –  The Cleveland Indians hosted "Ten Cent Beer Night", but had to forfeit the game to the Texas Rangers due to drunken and unruly fans.
 World Series – Oakland Athletics win 4 games to 1 over the Los Angeles Dodgers.
 14 October – Shigeo Nagashima, a well known sports player from Japan, retires from the Yomiuri Giants of Tokyo, after a 17-year baseball player career.

Basketball
 NCAA Division I Men's Basketball Championship –
 North Carolina State wins 76–64 over Marquette
 In the semifinals of this tournament, North Carolina State defeated UCLA 80–77 in overtime, ending UCLA's record streak of seven national titles. The last previous tournament not won by the Bruins was the 1966 tournament.
 NBA Finals –
 Boston Celtics win 4 games to 3 over the Milwaukee Bucks
 1974 ABA Finals –
 New York Nets defeat Utah Stars, 4 games to 1
 FIBA World Championship
 USSR World Champion
 19 January – Notre Dame defeats UCLA 71–70, ending the Bruins' record 88-game winning streak.

Boxing
 9 February in Paris – Carlos Monzón retains his world Middleweight title by a knockout in round seven over world Welterweight champion José Nápoles.
 17 to 30 August – First World Amateur Boxing Championships held in Havana, Cuba
 30 October in Kinshasa, Zaire – Muhammad Ali regained the World Heavyweight title by knocking out George Foreman in the eighth round of what was called The Rumble in the Jungle.

Canadian football
 Grey Cup – Montreal Alouettes won 20–7 over the Edmonton Eskimos
 Vanier Cup – Western Ontario Mustangs won 19–15 over the Toronto Varsity Blues

Cycling
 Giro d'Italia won by Eddy Merckx of Belgium
 Tour de France – Eddy Merckx of Belgium
 UCI Road World Championships – Men's road race – Eddy Merckx of Belgium

Disc sports
 Ken Westerfield and Jim Kenner introduce the first disc freestyle competition and other disc sports to Canada at the Canadian Open Frisbee Championships, in Toronto

Dog sledding
 Iditarod Trail Sled Dog Race Champion –
 Carl Huntington won with lead dog: Nugget

Field hockey
 Men's European Nations Cup held in Madrid and won by Spain
 Women's World Cup held in Mandelieu, France, and won by the Netherlands

Figure skating
 World Figure Skating Championships –
 Men's champion: Jan Hoffmann, Germany
 Ladies' champion: Christine Errath, Germany
 Pair skating champions: Irina Rodnina & Alexander Zaitsev, Soviet Union
 Ice dancing champions: Lyudmila Pakhomova & Alexandr Gorshkov, Soviet Union

Golf
Men's professional
 Masters Tournament – Gary Player
 U.S. Open – Hale Irwin
 British Open – Gary Player
 1974 PGA Championship – Lee Trevino
 PGA Tour money leader – Johnny Miller – $353,022
Men's amateur
 British Amateur – Trevor Homer
 U.S. Amateur – Jerry Pate
Women's professional
 LPGA Championship – Sandra Haynie
 U.S. Women's Open – Sandra Haynie
 LPGA Tour money leader – JoAnne Carner – $87,094

Harness racing
 United States Pacing Triple Crown races –
 Cane Pace – Boyden Hanover
 Little Brown Jug – Armbro Omaha
 Messenger Stakes – Armbro Omaha
 United States Trotting Triple Crown races –
 Hambletonian – Christopher T.
 Yonkers Trot – Spitfire Hanover
 Kentucky Futurity – Way Maker
 Australian Inter Dominion Harness Racing Championship –
 Pacers: Hondo Grattan

Horse racing
Steeplechases
 Cheltenham Gold Cup – Captain Christy
 Grand National – Red Rum
Flat races
 Australia – Melbourne Cup won by Think Big
 Canada – Queen's Plate won by Amber Herod
 France – Prix de l'Arc de Triomphe won by Allez France
 Ireland – Irish Derby Stakes won by English Prince
 English Triple Crown Races:
 2,000 Guineas Stakes – Nonoalco
 The Derby – Snow Knight
 St. Leger Stakes – Bustino
 United States Triple Crown Races:
 Kentucky Derby – Cannonade
 Preakness Stakes – Little Current
 Belmont Stakes – Little Current

Ice hockey
 Art Ross Trophy as the NHL's leading scorer during the regular season: Phil Esposito, Boston Bruins
 Hart Memorial Trophy for the NHL's Most Valuable Player: Phil Esposito – Boston Bruins
 Stanley Cup – Philadelphia Flyers win 4 games to 2 over the Boston Bruins
 World Hockey Championship –
Men's champion: Soviet Union defeated Czechoslovakia
 Avco World Trophy – Houston Aeros win 4 games to 0 over the Chicago Cougars
 NCAA Men's Ice Hockey Championship – University of Minnesota-Twin Cities Golden Gophers defeat Michigan Technological University Huskies 4–2 in Boston, Massachusetts

Lacrosse
 The 2nd World Lacrosse Championship is held in Melbourne, Australia. The United States win, and there is a 3-way tie for the runner-up position.
 The National Lacrosse League of 1974 and 1975 is formed. It is not related to the modern National Lacrosse League.
 The Rochester Griffens defeat the Philadelphia Wings in the six-game National Lacrosse League (1974–75) championship, 4 to 2 games.
 The New Westminster Salmonbellies win the Mann Cup.
 The Whitby Transporters win the Founders Cup.
 The Peterborough PCO's win the Minto Cup.
 The Johns Hopkins University Bluejays defeat the University of Maryland Terrapins 17–12 to win the NCAA Division I Men's Championship.

Motorsport

Rugby league
1974 Amco Cup
Captain Morgan Trophy
1974 New Zealand rugby league season
1974 NSWRFL season
1973–74 Northern Rugby Football League season / 1974–75 Northern Rugby Football League season

Rugby union
 80th Five Nations Championship series is won by Ireland

Snooker
 World Snooker Championship – Ray Reardon beats Graham Miles 22–12

Tennis
 Grand Slam in tennis men's results:
 Australian Open – Jimmy Connors
 French Open – Björn Borg
 Wimbledon championships – Jimmy Connors
 U.S. Open – Jimmy Connors
 Grand Slam in tennis women's results:
 Australian Open – Evonne Goolagong
 French Open – Chris Evert
 Wimbledon championships – Chris Evert
 US Open – Billie Jean King
 Davis Cup – South Africa wins over India (walkover) in world tennis.
 Last year in which US Open was played on grass courts

Volleyball
 1974 FIVB Men's World Championship held in Mexico City and won by Poland

Yacht racing
The New York Yacht Club retains the America's Cup as Courageous defeats Australian challenger Southern Cross, of the Royal Perth Yacht Club, 4 races to 0; it is Australian businessman Alan Bond's first Cup challenge

Multi-sport events
 Asian Games held in Teheran, Iran
 1974 British Commonwealth Games held in Christchurch, New Zealand
 Central American and Caribbean Games held in Santo Domingo, Dominican Republic
 International Olympic Committee choose Moscow to host the 1980 Summer Olympics

Awards
 Associated Press Male Athlete of the Year – Muhammad Ali, Boxing
 Associated Press Female Athlete of the Year – Chris Evert, Tennis
 Sports Illustrated Sportsman of the Year - Muhammad Ali, Boxing

References

 
Sports by year